Rylee Traicoff (born 9 November 2001) is a footballer who plays as a defender for Electric City FC in League1 Ontario. Born in Canada, she represented the Guyana women's national team.

University career
In 2018, Traicoff committed to the University of Bridgeport to play for the Bridgeport Purple Knights beginning in September 2019. She scored a brace on September 28, for her first two college goals, against the Lincoln Lions.

After one year with Bridgeport, she transferred to Canadian University Nipissing University to play for the Nipissing Lakers. In 2021, she was named an OUA Central Division All-Star. In 2022, she was named an OUA First Team All-Star.

Club career
In 2019, she played for FC Oshawa in League1 Ontario.

In 2022, she played for Electric City FC. She scored her first goal on July 3 against Unionville Milliken SC. She re-signed with the club for the 2023 season.

International career
Traicoff made her debut for the Guyana senior team at the 2018 CFU Women's Challenge Series, appearing in all three matches, making her debut on April 25 against Grenada.

She played for the Guyana U20 at the 2020 CONCACAF Women's U-20 Championship qualification.

See also
List of Guyana women's international footballers

References

External links

2001 births
Living people
Citizens of Guyana through descent
Guyanese women's footballers
Women's association football defenders
Bridgeport Purple Knights women's soccer players
Guyana women's international footballers
Guyanese expatriate footballers
Guyanese expatriate sportspeople in the United States
Expatriate women's soccer players in the United States
Sportspeople from Whitby, Ontario
Soccer people from Ontario
Canadian women's soccer players
Canadian expatriate soccer players
Canadian expatriate sportspeople in the United States
Canadian sportspeople of Guyanese descent
League1 Ontario (women) players
FC Oshawa players
Electric City FC players